The prospect of nuclear power in Australia has been a topic of public debate since the 1950s. Australia has one nuclear plant in Lucas Heights, Sydney, but is not used to produce nuclear power, but instead is used to produce medical radioisotopes. It also produces material or carries out analyses for the mining industry, for forensic purposes and for research. Australia hosts 33% of the world's uranium deposits and is the world's third largest producer of uranium after Kazakhstan and Canada.

Australia's extensive low-cost coal and natural gas reserves have historically been used as strong arguments for avoiding nuclear power. The Liberal Party has advocated for the development of nuclear power and nuclear industries in Australia since the 1950s. An anti-nuclear movement developed in Australia in the 1970s, initially focusing on prohibiting nuclear weapons testing and limiting the development of uranium mining and export. The movement also challenged the environmental and economic costs of developing nuclear power and the possibility of fissile material being diverted into nuclear weapons production.

A resurgence of interest in nuclear power was prompted by Prime Minister John Howard in 2007 in response to the need to move to low-carbon methods of power generation in order to reduce the effects of global warming on Australia. In 2015, South Australian Premier Jay Weatherill initiated a Nuclear Fuel Cycle Royal Commission to investigate the state's future role in the nuclear fuel cycle.  there are three active uranium mines, Ranger in Northern Territory, Olympic Dam in South Australia, and Beverley with Four Mile in South Australia. The Royal Commission determined that there was no case for the introduction of nuclear power to the electricity grid in South Australia, but it did not consider its potential interstate. In its final report of May 2016, the Royal Commission recommended that prohibitions preventing the development of nuclear power plants nationally should be repealed.

In 2017, former Prime Minister Tony Abbott advocated for legislation to be changed to allow the construction of nuclear power plants in Australia. The former Deputy Premier of New South Wales, John Barilaro, has also been urging for debate on the prospect of nuclear power in Australia, including the revisiting of Jervis Bay as a prospective site for a nuclear power plant. In November 2017, Senator Cory Bernardi presented the Nuclear Fuel Cycle (Facilitation) Bill 2017 in the Senate, with the intention of repealing existing prohibitions preventing the establishment of nuclear power in Australia.

Unsuccessful nuclear power station concepts and proposals

1952 Upper Spencer Gulf, South Australia 
In 1952, South Australian Premier Thomas Playford expressed with confidence that the first location for a nuclear power station in Australia would be on the shores of Spencer Gulf. In July of that year, it was announced more specifically that Backy Bay (later renamed Fitzgerald Bay), located between Whyalla and Port Augusta would be the site. The station was never constructed, though the region reemerged again in 2007 as a prospect for a nuclear power station during the Federal leadership of Prime Minister John Howard.

1969 Jervis Bay, New South Wales 

In 1969, a 500 MW nuclear power station was proposed for the Jervis Bay Territory, 200 km south of Sydney. A local opposition campaign began, and the South Coast Trades and Labour Council (covering workers in the region) announced that it would refuse to build the reactor. Some environmental studies and site works were completed, and two rounds of tenders were called and evaluated, but in 1971 the Australian government decided not to proceed with the project, citing economic reasons.

1979 Perth, Western Australia 
In 1977–78, the Western Australian Government, under the leadership of Charles Court, announced plans for a nuclear power reactor near Perth. 1977 was seen as the year of mass mobilisation in WA, with 300 at the first anti-nuclear demonstration to 9,000 at the third protest in the inner city of Perth. Despite public protest, the WA Government selected a first site for a nuclear reactor in 1979 at Wilbinga, 70 kilometres north of Perth. Court predicted that at least another 20 nuclear power stations would be needed by the end of the century to meet rapidly growing power demand, but none of this came to pass.

1980s and 2007 Portland, Victoria 
In 2007 it was reported that businessman Ron Walker, director of the company Australian Nuclear Energy had considered Portland as a possible location for a future nuclear power station. Glenelg Mayor Gilbert Wilson said that he thought it was unlikely that such a project would receive community support. He added that he believed any community in Victoria would oppose it, were it to be located in their area. A concept to develop a 2,400 MW nuclear power station at Portland at a cost of $3 billion was previously raised and abandoned in the early 1980s. In 1983, nuclear power development became prohibited under the Nuclear Activities (Prohibitions) Act 1983 in the state of Victoria and the law remains in place in 2020. Section 8 of the Act also prohibits uranium milling, enriching, fuel production, fuel reprocessing and waste storage.

2007 Upper Spencer Gulf, South Australia 
While a nuclear power station in South Australia's Upper Spencer Gulf region was discussed intermittently from 2007, no formal proposal to construct a plant was ever made.

In 2007, The Australian newspaper revealed that a location near Port Augusta in the Upper Spencer Gulf region of South Australia was being considered for a future nuclear power station. A company called Australian Nuclear Energy had been registered on 1 June 2006 with three prominent Australian businessmen as major shareholders: Robert Champion de Crespigny (former Chancellor of the University of Adelaide), Ron Walker (former Lord Mayor of Melbourne) and Hugh Morgan (former director of Western Mining Corporation). Prime Minister John Howard supported the formation of the company, describing it as a "great idea".

Five days after the company was registered, the Federal Government established the Switkowski review into nuclear energy. The company examined the viability of building a 20-50 megawatt pilot station in the Upper Spencer Gulf area, at a cost of $70 million-$150 million, and had spoken to American company GE about supplying a nuclear reactor.

South Australian Premier Mike Rann responded to news of the investigation by saying:

On 7 April 2011, former Australian politician Alexander Downer addressed the students of UCL's Adelaide campus, discussing nuclear power. A long term advocate for nuclear power, he told The Australian that the South Australian town of Whyalla (also on Upper Spencer Gulf) would be ideal for a nuclear power station to serve the interests of BHP Billiton, South Australia and the eastern states. He stated:

The Olympic Dam project was expected to use about 400 MWh of electricity per day if the proposed mine expansion went ahead. In 2011, the Olympic Dam mine expansion received State and Federal environmental approval, but in 2012, the BHP Billiton board decided not to proceed with the mine expansion as planned citing weakened economic conditions as the reason.

In 2012 a first-of-a-kind study was undertaken in which a combination of solar and wind technology, proposed as a replacement for the ageing Northern coal power station, was comprehensively compared with a reference nuclear reactor. Assuming equal public confidence and an established regulatory framework, the nuclear energy option compared favourably on cost, reliability, commercial availability, plant lifetime and greenhouse gas abatement, among other criteria.

Nuclear-powered submarines

In April 2016, Australia committed to purchasing French-designed Barracuda-class attack submarines with customised diesel propulsion systems, despite the existing French fleet being wholly nuclear-powered. On 15 September 2021, following the signing of a security partnership named AUKUS between Australia, the United States and the United Kingdom, it was announced that Australia would develop nuclear-powered submarines, using US and British technology. This sparked outrage in France which lost the contract for what was to become the most expensive defence acquisition in Australia's history. France withdrew their ambassadors in the US and Australia in protest of the deal. The surprise termination of the agreement by Australia under the Morrison Government was settled with a payment of €555 million from Australia to France. Anthony Albanese stated that the failed agreement would cost Australia 3.4 billion dollars with "almost nothing to show for it".

Nuclear power politics

As uranium prices began rising from about 2003, proponents of nuclear power advocated it as a solution to global warming and the Australian government began taking an interest. In late 2006 and early 2007, then Prime Minister John Howard made widely reported statements in favour of nuclear power, on environmental grounds. Faced with these proposals to examine nuclear power as a possible response to climate change, anti-nuclear campaigners and scientists in Australia claimed that nuclear power could not significantly substitute for other power sources, and that uranium mining itself could become a significant source of greenhouse gas emissions.

In 2006, the Howard Government commissioned the Switkowski report, an investigation into the merits of Nuclear power in Australia. The report concluded that nuclear power would be competitive with coal power stations if carbon credit sanctions were implemented upon Australia. The Industry would have been able to produce its first station in 10 years and could have delivered 25 stations by 2050 supplying Australia with a third of its base load power.

Queensland introduced legislation to ban nuclear power development on 20 February 2007. Tasmania attempted a ban on nuclear power facilities but later did not pass the bill. Both bills were formulated in response to the pro-nuclear position of John Howard, and the release of the Switkowski report.

Anti-nuclear campaigns were given added impetus by public concern about the sites for possible reactors: fears exploited by anti-nuclear power political parties in the lead-up to a national election in 2007. The Rudd Labor government was elected in November 2007 and was opposed to nuclear power for Australia. The anti-nuclear movement continues to be active in Australia, opposing expansion of existing uranium mines, lobbying against the development of nuclear power in Australia, and criticising proposals for nuclear waste disposal sites.

At the same time, a number of Australian politicians have argued that the development of nuclear power is in the country's best interests. Notably, on 13 June 2008, the annual New South Wales state conference of the National Party passed the resolution, proposed by the delegates from Dubbo, supporting research into the development of a nuclear power industry and the establishment of an international nuclear waste storage facility in Australia. The resolution was opposed by the delegates from NSW's north coast and by the party's state leader, Andrew Stoner.

In 2005, the Australian government threatened to use its constitutional powers to take control of the approval process for new uranium mines from the anti-nuclear Northern Territory government. Also, the government is negotiating with China to weaken safeguard terms to allow uranium exports there. States controlled by the Australian Labor Party were blocking the development of new mines in their jurisdictions while the ALP's "No New Mines policy" was in force.

In April 2007, the Labor party, under the new leadership of Kevin Rudd voted at their national conference to abandon the policy. The vote was only won by a narrow margin- 205 to 190, and heavy internal criticism resulted. Ministers Peter Garrett and Anthony Albanese remained outspokenly opposed to the decision due to the unresolved problems of nuclear waste storage and nuclear weapons proliferation.

The John Howard-led Coalition government went to the November 2007 federal election with a pro-nuclear power platform. The Labor Party won the election, and maintained its opposition to nuclear power in Australia.

Nuclear debate in Australia increased after the Fukushima nuclear disaster in 2011. Some protesters demanded a halt to uranium mining and nuclear power generation in their country and throughout the world.

During the Labor-led Rudd-Gillard Government the party's opposition to nuclear power was upheld, while Resources and Energy Minister Martin Ferguson demonstrated his support for the uranium mining sector. Ferguson retired in 2013 and was replaced by Gary Gray who subsequently indicated support for future nuclear industrial development in Australia. At a South Australian mining and energy sector conference he stated "I am optimistic that we will get (power) generation issues attended to and that it will be done in a timely fashion".

In 2013, the Liberal party, led by Tony Abbott, resumed power and reopened discussions about the future of nuclear power in Australia. Since Abbott's appointment, former Prime Minister John Howard, former foreign minister Alexander Downer, and several members of the Abbott government have openly advocated for the consideration of nuclear power development, including then Foreign Minister Julie Bishop.

In November 2013, University of Adelaide Professor of climatology Tom Wigley co-authored an open letter calling for an expansion of nuclear energy as a tool against climate change. Further calls for the consideration of nuclear power came from academics, Australian media and The Australian Academy of Technological Sciences and Engineering.

In 2014 the federal government released an energy green paper which articulated the potential for Australia in modern nuclear capacity, including small modular reactors, generation IV reactor technology and the role of thorium as nuclear fuel, though industry minister Ian MacFarlane opined that "there is no need to have a debate in regard to nuclear energy in Australia but we should focus on the opportunities that nuclear energy presents in other countries and build our uranium industry to take advantage of that." In contrast, foreign minister Julie Bishop declared support for nuclear energy, saying "It's an obvious conclusion that if you want to bring down your greenhouse gas emissions dramatically you have to embrace a form of low or zero-emissions energy and that's nuclear, the only known 24/7 baseload power supply with zero emissions." The call for sensible discussion was publicly welcomed by economists and at least one member of the federal opposition. The CEO of Origin Energy spoke in support of the prospect and BusinessSA demanded the lifting of federal prohibitions so that debate on specific designs could proceed.

In the lead-up to the 2014 South Australian election, Business SA proposed the establishment of a nuclear industry to enhance the state's economic growth.

In December 2014, Australian Prime Minister Tony Abbott told the ABC that he was open to considering a proposal for a nuclear power project for Australia should one be made. He said that proponents of such a project should not expect to receive a government subsidy and that "if it's going to happen, it's going to happen because it's economically feasible." He also described nuclear energy as "the one absolutely proven way of generating emissions-free baseload power."

In January 2015 an open letter was addressed to environmental organisations and signed by seventy-five distinguished climate science experts, including twenty-seven Australian-based academics, endorsing the findings of a peer-reviewed article which quantified the potential climate and biodiversity benefits of nuclear energy.

In February 2015 South Australian Premier Jay Weatherill announced that a Royal Commission would be held to investigate South Australia's future role in the nuclear fuel cycle. Kevin Scarce, former Governor of South Australia, retired Rear Admiral of the Royal Australian Navy and current Chancellor of the University of Adelaide, was appointed Commissioner. A final report of the commission's findings was published in May 2016 which recommended that several currently existing legislative constraints be repealed.

In June 2016 Australia joined the Generation IV International Forum.

In June 2017, former Prime Minister Tony Abbott acknowledged fellow former Prime Minister Bob Hawke's support for expanding the nuclear industry in Australia and asserted that the "Australian Labor government under Premier Jay Weatherill would like to develop new industries to supplement the uranium mine at Roxby Downs. Why not have a nuclear submarine servicing facility in that state – and the industries that would inevitably spin-off?"

In November 2017, Senator Cory Bernardi presented the Nuclear Fuel Cycle (Facilitation) Bill in the Senate. The bill is intended to repeal prohibitions preventing the future establishment of nuclear power in Australia and the further processing of uranium and spent nuclear fuel. It is the 6th oldest bill still currently before the senate as of 10 October 2019.

In 2019 the federal government held an inquiry into nuclear power. It recommended that the ban be removed for advanced nuclear reactors.

On 6 June 2019 the state of NSW began an inquiry on the Uranium Mining and Nuclear Facilities (Prohibitions) Repeal Bill 2019.

On 14 August 2019 the state of Victoria launched an inquiry into Australia's nuclear prohibition.

In September 2021, the governments of Australia, UK and US signed an agreement that would share technology between the three countries for building or acquiring nuclear-powered submarines.

Nuclear waste storage
One of the arguments often made by opponents of nuclear power in Australia is the problem of the management of long-lived and toxic nuclear wastes, including, but not limited to spent nuclear fuel.

A case has been variously made for Australia to centralise its nuclear wastes, which are held in temporary storage at various locations around the country.

In response to the Northern Land Council's withdrawal of a section of Muckaty Station in the Northern Territory as a potential nuclear waste facility for Australian domestically produced nuclear waste in 2014, it was articulated that the process had suffered from a lack of recognition of the limited hazard posed by existing waste, which is currently stored at over one hundred sites in cities and industrial areas. Furthermore, an open tender process for volunteered sites has attracted interest from pastoralists. Site nominations closed on 5 May 2015, in a process endorsed by Federal MP Rowan Ramsay. Ramsay supports the establishment of a waste storage facility in South Australia, and has said: 

On 29 April 2015 Josh Frydenberg MP, the Minister for Resources, Energy and Northern Australia, announced the shortlisting of Wallerberdina Station near Barndioota in South Australia's Flinders Ranges as a possible site. This site was ruled out in 2019, however two sites near Kimba are still possibilities at the end of 2019.

Nuclear law 
The Commonwealth Environment Protection and Biodiversity Conservation Act 1999 prohibits certain nuclear actions specified in s.22A unless a federal approval is obtained. It specifically prohibits nuclear power generation in s.140A (an amendment insisted upon by the Australian Democrats). The Act states that the Minister must not approve an action consisting of or involving the construction or operation of a nuclear fuel fabrication plant, or a nuclear power station, or an enrichment plant, or a reprocessing facility.

As of 2018, Australia has one operating nuclear reactor, the OPAL research reactor at Lucas Heights which supplies the vast majority of Australia's nuclear medicine. It replaced the High Flux Australian Reactor which operated from 1958 to 2007 at the same site. These are the only two nuclear reactors to have been used in Australia. Neither of them has been used to generate electricity.

Additional nuclear industrial prohibitions exist under state legislation in South Australia and Victoria.

South Australia 
The objects of the Nuclear Waste Storage Facility (Prohibition) Act 2000 are "to protect the health, safety and welfare of the people of South Australia and to protect the environment in which they live by prohibiting the establishment of certain nuclear waste storage facilities in this State." As such, the Act prohibits the:
 Construction or operation of nuclear waste storage facility
 Importation or transportation of nuclear waste for delivery to a nuclear waste storage facility

Victoria 
The objects of the Nuclear Activities (Prohibitions) Act 1983 are:

As such, the Act prohibits the construction or operation of a nuclear reactor as well as exploration:
 for the production of uranium or thorium ore concentrates
 for conversion or enrichment of any nuclear material
 for the fabrication of fuels for use in nuclear reactors
 for reprocessing spent fuel

Nuclear power debate in Australia
In the 2010 book Why vs. Why: Nuclear Power Barry Brook and Ian Lowe discuss and articulate the debate about nuclear power. Brook argues that there are various reasons why people should say "yes" to nuclear power, and these reasons include:
 Because renewable energy and energy efficiency may or may not solve the energy and climate crisis
 Because nuclear fuel is virtually unlimited and "packs a huge energy punch"
 Because new technology solves the "nuclear waste" problem
 Because nuclear power is the safest energy option
Lowe argues that there are various reasons why people should say "no" to nuclear power:
 Because it is not a fast enough response to climate change
 Because it is too expensive
 Because the need for baseload electricity is exaggerated
 Because the problem of waste remains unresolved
In 2015, both authors were appointed to the Expert Advisory Committee of the Nuclear Fuel Cycle Royal Commission in South Australia.

Advocates for nuclear power

Active advocates

Companies 
 Australian Nuclear Energy is an Australian company established in 2006 to investigate the feasibility of developing a nuclear power industry in Australia. It sought to investigate the possibility of constructing a station in South Australia or Victoria. Directors include Ron Walker (former Lord Mayor of Melbourne), Hugh Morgan (former director of Western Mining Corporation) and Robert Champion de Crespigny (former Chancellor of the University of Adelaide). Ron Walker publicly welcomed the announcement in 2015 of a Royal Commission to investigate South Australia's role in the nuclear fuel cycle.
 Silex Systems is an Australian technology company which has developed SILEX (Separation of isotopes by laser excitation) for the purposes of uranium enrichment. The company has partnered with multinational nuclear power plant manufacturers General Electric and Hitachi and the world's largest uranium mining company, Cameco through a joint-venture called Global Laser Enrichment. In 2013, Silex Systems' CEO Dr Michael Goldsworthy advocated for Australia to embrace nuclear power. He told the ABC:

 SMR Nuclear Technology is a private Australian company established in 2012 with the goal of deploying small modular reactors in Australia and changing legislation to allow for it. The reactors are light water reactors and can be air-cooled so that coastal locations (which would otherwise provide seawater for cooling) would not be required. Technical director Tony Irwin described the reactors as being "the size of a large petrol filling station ... and the reactor is underground so it is again safe from external hazards or terrorists." Possible customers for SMR Nuclear Technology include large mining operations in remote locations. He also stated that the reactors would be suitable for integration into the existing Australian electricity grid system. 
 South Australian Nuclear Energy Systems is an Australian private company registered on 1 January 2014. The company is chaired by merchant banker and former News International director Bruce Hundertmark and its board includes Ian Kowalick (former chief of staff to ex-Liberal premier John Olsen), Richard Cherry (former executive officer of the US nuclear industry and consultant), Eric Dunlop and scientists Tom Wigley and Stephen Lincoln. The company has discussed its business proposals with Federal and State politicians, with a view to amending laws that ban nuclear power generation. Hundertmark told The New Daily in 2014 that "The funding of the things that need to be done is not a real problem – the problem is to get the legislative changes needed".

Politicians 

 In 2011, South Australian Treasurer Kevin Foley said that he thought Australia should embrace nuclear power.
Former Prime Minister John Howard continues to advocate for nuclear power. In 2013 he stated that he believed nuclear power, shale oil, and fracking for gas will meet the world's energy needs.
 Former Federal politicians Alexander Downer (Liberal) and Martin Ferguson (Labor) have both advocated for nuclear power and for the expansion of uranium mining in Australia. In 2010, Liberal Opposition member Greg Hunt said of Ferguson: "Behind the scenes, we all know Martin Ferguson is agitating for nuclear energy against his Prime Minister, against Senator Wong." Despite coming from opposing major parties, Downer has described Ferguson as:

 In 2013, Gary Gray suggested that opportunities existed for Australia in nuclear power and the nuclear fuel cycle.
 Former Prime Minister Tony Abbott and the coalition government he presided over expressed support for nuclear industrial development in Australia. The Federal Government allocated $2.5 billion in the May 2014 budget to fund clean energy initiatives, including "clean power stations". On 13 June 2014, Abbott said that the Australian government "did not believe in ostracising any particular fuel". In 2010, while leader of the Opposition, Tony Abbott stated that he believed nuclear power was the only proven way to generate baseload electricity while reducing carbon emissions and maintaining Australia's standard of living.
 Liberal party Senator, David Fawcett offered expert advice to a concept plan for A nuclear future for South Australia, published in January 2013 by the Defence Teaming Centre.
 In November 2014, Federal Foreign Minister Julie Bishop described nuclear power as an "obvious direction" in reducing Australia's carbon emissions while utilizing the country's reserves of uranium.
 In 2015, Family First leader and Senator Bob Day presented a bill intended to legalise nuclear power and other nuclear fuel cycle activities in Australia. The bill did not pass. He also expressed his support for nuclear-powered submarines.
 In December 2016, former Prime Minister Bob Hawke described nuclear power as a means to fight global warming, and restated his support for Australia to import spent nuclear fuel from other countries.
 In 2017, the Sydney Morning Herald named the following coalition MPs as supporting nuclear energy in Australia's future: Andrew Broad, James Paterson, Tony Pasin, Tim Wilson, Chris Back, Craig Kelly, Eric Abetz, Andrew Hastie, Warren Entsch, Bridget McKenzie and Rowan Ramsey.
 Former Liberal party Senator, Sean Edwards
 Former Premier of Western Australia, Colin Barnett
 Former ALP president, Warren Mundine
 South Australian Labor party MP Leesa Vlahos
 Former National party MP Karlene Maywald signed an open letter in 2016 following the Nuclear Fuel Cycle Royal Commission in SA, urging governments to continue considering the importation of spent nuclear fuel. A similar open letter was also signed in March 2017 by former MPs Trish White (Labor) and Ian McLachlan (Liberal).
 In 2017, Deputy Premier of New South Wales John Barilaro expressed his interest in exploring the possibility of nuclear power for Australia.
 In November 2017, Cory Bernardi of the Australian Conservatives introduced the Nuclear Fuel Cycle (Facilitation) Bill in the Senate. During subsequent debates, the bill was strongly supported by Senators Eric Abetz, David Leyonhjelm and Ian Macdonald.

Defence 
 Paul Barratt, former secretary of Australia's Department of Defence, has advocated for nuclear power to be adopted in order to reduce Australia's carbon emissions. He has an honours degree in physics from the University of New England and is a friend of fellow nuclear power advocate and former Prime Minister, John Howard.
 The Defence Teaming Centre's chief executive officer Chris Burns believes that South Australia could become the "future Dubai of the world" if it embraces nuclear industries, including enrichment of nuclear fuel. 
 Governor General Peter Cosgrove believes that in the context of climate change "there is hardly a cleaner energy resource" than nuclear power. Cosgrove believes that Australia should be moving towards nuclear power and has disputed claims that nuclear power is unsafe, stating "We are a rich and technologically advanced nation sitting in a geologically stable continent. So surely we can expect to build and operate safe nuclear power stations."
 Australian Industry Group Defence Council chairman Chris Jenkins has recommended that Australia considers acquiring nuclear submarines. University of NSW Professor of International Security, Professor Alan Dupont supported the recommendation and defence analyst Professor Ross Babbage added that such a development would require a "specialist class of nuclear technicians" to service the fleet.

Individuals 
 In 2006, Ziggy Switkowski was appointed to chair a Commonwealth Government inquiry into the viability of a domestic nuclear power industry. The inquiry concluded that Australia is well positioned to increase its production and export of uranium as well as adding nuclear power to its own energy mix. However, an independent panel of Australian scientists and nuclear experts have been critical of these findings, saying that they relied upon flawed assumptions while dodging important questions such as the disposal of radioactive waste and the potential greenhouse gas implications of increased mining. Switkowski was later appointed chairman of the Australian Nuclear Science and Technology Organisation (ANSTO). His term as chairman concluded at the end of 2010. 
 Ben Heard is an environmental consultant and founder of Decarbonise SA, a blog where he advocates for nuclear power in South Australia. He has co-authored numerous articles with scientist Barry Brook, including a nuclear series for the South Australian Chamber of Mines & Energy. His business, ThinkClimate Consulting, has provided commercial services to uranium mining company, Heathgate Resources. 
 Dick Smith held firm on his support for nuclear power following the Fukushima nuclear disaster in 2011. He said that burning coal "could result in hundreds of millions of people dying, and if that's true … that could be far worse than using nuclear."

Media 
 Commercial radio personality Amanda Blair appeared on WIN's Today program in March 2015. She repeated the phrase "go nukes" and talked about a possible nuclear waste dump in South Australia's north as being an economic boon. 
 David Penberthy, Editor-in-chief of the News Limited website news.com.au published an editorial entitled "SA ticks boxes for nuclear energy and waste storage" on 13 March 2015. He drew attention to the modest number of protesters acknowledging the fourth anniversary of the Fukushima nuclear disaster and promoted the idea of South Australia becoming "the nuclear state". 
 Senior writer for The Age, John Watson has espoused the safety of nuclear power stations in several pieces in 2013 with reference to the Fukushima nuclear disaster. 
 ABC TV program Stateline in South Australia has run a number of stories on nuclear power since 2005. Voices in support of nuclear power including politicians, public servants and representatives of the uranium mining industry have outnumbered opponents. Stateline's former South Australian host, Ian Henschke has also written for The Advertiser espousing the merits of nuclear power. 
 The Advertiser has promoted uranium mining in South Australia and has advocated for the expansion of the nuclear industry in the state by interviewing spokespeople from the business community, uranium mining industry, economists, academics and industry consultants. Reporting journalists include Cameron England, Christopher Russell, Valerina Changerathil, Tory Shepherd and Andrew Hough. The newspaper has also published many opinion editorial pieces promoting nuclear power. These pieces often diminish safety concerns held by opponents and promote the safety of nuclear power and in some cases, exposure to ionizing radiation. They also focus on nuclear power's ability to provide base-load power and its potential to replace coal-fired power plants thus reducing risk of catastrophic climate change. Opinion writers include Barry Brook, Geoff Russell and Ian Henschke. Counterpoints occasionally feature from authors such as Jim Green from Friends of the Earth.

Scientists 
 
 Barry Brook is the current Chair of Environmental Sustainability at the University of Tasmania and a former professor of climate science in the School of Earth and Environmental Sciences at the University of Adelaide. He has been a strong advocate for nuclear power since 2009, promoting the technology as a means to mitigate the impacts of climate change, especially the Integral Fast Reactor. His most recent book is Why vs Why: Nuclear Power. The book was co-authored with Professor Ian Lowe, who represents opposing views. 
 Tom Quirk is a nuclear physicist, former Rio Tinto employee and former board member of the Institute of Public Affairs. He supports the expansion of Australia's role in the nuclear fuel chain to include uranium enrichment, fuel reprocessing and waste storage. 
 Tom Wigley and Stephen Lincoln are scientists employed at the University of Adelaide. They are also directors of the start-up company, South Australian Nuclear Energy Systems.

Organizations 
 The Australian Nuclear Forum supports the development of nuclear power in Australia. Its members include Terry Krieg, a retired geology teacher from Port Lincoln who has supported nuclear power since 1981 and has appeared several times reading prepared statements on ABC Radio National since 2011.
 Australian Workers Union National Secretary Paul Howes has been an active advocate for the legalisation of nuclear power in Australia and called for an urgent debate in 2009. He also referred to the uranium mining ban in Queensland and exploration bans in New South Wales and Victoria as ''superstitions of another age.'' Queensland and New South Wales bans were subsequently lifted.
 Business SA, South Australia's Chamber of Commerce and Industry, promotes nuclear power development. The Chamber has demanded the lifting of federal prohibitions so that debate on specific nuclear reactor designs can proceed. In December 2014, spokesperson Nigel McBride stated: "We need governments to get out of the way." Business SA is pushing for a specific project to be considered; a $3 billion micro reactor known as a Prism power plant designed by General Electric and Hitachi. A fast-breeder reactor, it would convert used nuclear fuel rods and surplus plutonium into energy. He described the technology as safe and innovative, and argued the proposal would pay its own way after five years.
 The Committee for the Economic Development of Australia (CEDA) supports the development of nuclear power in Australia. A policy document entitled Australia's nuclear options? was published by CEDA in November 2011. The document features five main chapters written by nuclear advocates including Barry Brook, Tony Irwin, Tom Quirk and Tony Wood.
 Engineers Australia's spokesperson Tony Irwin has called for "simple legislation change" to allow the development of nuclear industries, particularly the deployment of small modular reactors. Irwin is also technical director for the private company SMR Nuclear Technology.
 The Minerals Council of Australia advocates for nuclear power in Australia. Former BHP Billiton executive Daniel Zavattiero represents the MCA's uranium portfolio.
 The South Australian Chamber of Mines and Energy (SACOME) advocates for the development of nuclear power in South Australia. South Australia is home to the majority of the nation's uranium mines, and the Chamber represents the interests of several corporate members engaged in uranium mining and exploration. Members include Alliance Resources, Areva Resources Australia, BHP Billiton, Heathgate Resources, Uranium SA and others.
 The World Nuclear Association supports the development of nuclear power in Australia. The organisation's Senior Research Analyst and former Director of Public Information is Ian Hore-Lacy. Hore-Lacy was previously the director of the Melbourne-based Uranium Information Centre and worked for CRA (now the Rio Tinto Group) for 19 years.
Nuclear for Climate Australia is an advocacy group that proposes series of SMR as low-carbon and cost-effective solution for climate mitigation.

Past and former advocates 
 Professor David Wigg (1933–2010), was the clinical examiner in radiotherapy physics for the Royal Australian and New Zealand College of Radiologists from 1970 to 1978, and directed the expansion of radiation oncology and clinical radiobiology at the Royal Adelaide Hospital from 1980 until 1997. In the years before his death, he published his views on the safety of low-dose radiation and the related misconceptions that impeded effective medical uses of radiation and the benefits of uranium mining and nuclear energy.
 The Australian Uranium Association was founded in September 2006 and advocated for the interests of uranium mining member companies. Its two full members were BHP Billiton and Energy Resources Australia (ERA), operators of the nation's two most established uranium mines: Olympic Dam and Ranger. In 2013, its work was integrated into the operation of the Minerals Council of Australia and the association was wound up.
 The Uranium Information Centre promoted uranium mining and nuclear power in Australia from its establishment in 1978 until 2008. It was effectively succeeded by the Australian Uranium Association.
 Tim Flannery is a professor at Macquarie University, and the chairman of the Copenhagen Climate Council, an international climate change awareness group. In 2006 he supported nuclear power as a possible solution for reducing Australia's carbon emissions, but in 2007 he changed his position and in May 2007 told a business gathering in Sydney that while nuclear energy does have a role elsewhere in the world, Australia's abundance of renewable resources rule out the need for nuclear power in the near term.  He does however feel that Australia should and will have to supply its uranium to those other countries that do not have access to renewables like Australia does.
 Sir Ernest William Titterton (1916–1990) was a nuclear physicist and professor who publicly advocated nuclear power for Australia.
 Sir Philip Baxter (1905–1989), a British chemical engineer, was one of the most prolific public advocates of nuclear power in Australia.

Opposition to nuclear power 

Opposition to the development of nuclear power in Australia originated in the 1970s. The Australian anti-nuclear movement initially lobbied for bans on nuclear weapons testing in the Pacific and on uranium mining in Australia. Dr Helen Caldicott, a pediatrician from Melbourne emerged as a leading voice of the movement as she conducted public talks and informed politicians and trade unions of the health risks of exposure to ionizing radiation.

Western Australia has a significant share of the Australia's uranium reserves, but between 2002 and 2008, a statewide ban on uranium mining was in force. The ban was lifted when the Liberal Party was voted into power in the state and, as of 2010, many companies are exploring for uranium in Western Australia. One of the industry's major players, the mining company BHP Billiton, planned to develop the Yeelirrie uranium project in a 17 billion dollar project. Two other projects in Western Australia are further advanced then BHP's Yeelirrie, these being the Lake Way uranium project, which is pursued by Toro Energy, and the Lake Maitland uranium project, pursued by Mega Uranium. But it is unlikely that any new projects will enter active development until the market improves. As of 2013 uranium prices are very low.
 
As of late 2010, there were calls for Australians to debate whether the nation should adopt nuclear power as part of its energy mix. Nuclear power is seen to be "a divisive issue that can arouse deep passions among those for and against".

Following the March 2011 Fukushima nuclear emergency in Japan, where three nuclear reactors were damaged by explosions, Ian Lowe sees the nuclear power option as being risky and unworkable for Australia. Lowe says nuclear power is too expensive, with insurmountable problems associated with waste disposal and weapons proliferation. It is also not a fast enough response to address climate change. Lowe advocates renewable energy which is "quicker, less expensive and less dangerous than nuclear".

Nuclear reactors are banned in Queensland and Tasmania. Uranium mining was previously prohibited in New South Wales under the Uranium Prohibition Act of 1986, however in 2012 Premier Barry O'Farrell amended the legislation to allow prospecting and mining of uranium in that State.

In December 2011, the sale of uranium to India was a contentious issue. MPs clashed over the issue and protesters were marched from Sydney's convention centre before Prime Minister Julia Gillard's motion to remove a party ban on uranium sales to India was narrowly supported 206 votes to 185. Long-time anti-nuclear campaigner Peter Garrett MP spoke against the motion.

More than 400 people joined a "Lizard's Revenge march" to the Olympic Dam site in July 2012. The anti-nuclear activists, including Elder Kevin Buzzacott, protested against the mine expansion and the uranium industry. They say the company and the government have put short-term economic gain ahead of environmental and health concerns. Organiser Nectaria Calan said police harassed protesters, demanding identification and controlling access to and from their campsite.

In March 2012, hundreds of anti-nuclear demonstrators converged on the Australian headquarters of global mining giants BHP Billiton and Rio Tinto. The 500-strong march through southern Melbourne called for an end to uranium mining in Australia, and included speeches and performances by representatives of the expatriate Japanese community as well as Australia's Indigenous communities, who are concerned about the effects of uranium mining near tribal lands. There were also events in Sydney.

A site within Muckaty Station was being considered for Australia's low-level and intermediate-level radioactive waste storage and disposal facility. The plan was subject to a Federal Court challenge. The nomination of Muckaty was withdrawn in June 2014.

Historically, many prospective Australian uranium mines have been constrained by active antinuclear opposition, but state governments have now approved mine development in Western Australia and Queensland. But it is unlikely that any new projects will enter active development until the market improves. As of 2013 uranium prices are very low. Cameco placed the Kintyre project on hold until market prices improve and Paladin has stated that its project proposals (Bigrlyi, Angela/Pamela, Manyingee, Oobagooma, and Valhalla/Skal) need higher uranium market prices before they can proceed. Toro wants to take the Wiluna proposal to the development phase, but has not been successful in attracting equity investors. When market prices go up again, so that mine development is justified, most projects would need at least five years to proceed to production.

As of 2015, nuclear power remains opposed by a number of not-for-profit and environmental organizations, political parties and their members, renewable energy advocates, and anti-nuclear campaigners. There are several prominent Australians who have publicly expressed anti-nuclear views:

 Dorothy Auchterlonie
 Van Badham
 Sandra Bloodworth
 David Bradbury
 Bob Brown
 Eileen Kampakuta Brown
 Kevin Buzzacott
 Helen Caldicott
 Moss Cass
 Ian Cohen
 Kerry Nettle
 Mark Diesendorf
 Jim Falk
 Peter Garrett
 Jim Green
 Margaret Holmes
 Jacqui Katona
 Sandra Kanck
 Ian Lowe
 Scott Ludlam
 Yvonne Margarula
 Dee Margetts
 John Quiggin
 Nancy Shelley
 Jo Vallentine
 Giz Watson
 Patrick White
 Stuart White

Selected anti-nuclear groups

 Australian Conservation Foundation
 Australian Greens
 Australian Nuclear Free Alliance
 Conservation Council of South Australia
 Friends of the Earth Australia
 Greenpeace Australia Pacific
 Kupa Piti Kungka Tjuta
 The Australia Institute
 The Wilderness Society

Political parties 
 The Australian Greens are formally opposed to nuclear power in Australia. The party's spokesperson on the issue is South Australian senator, Sarah Hanson-Young.
 The Australian Labor Party was internally conflicted over uranium mining policy during the leadership of former Prime Minister Bob Hawke during the 1980s, but has maintained opposition to the development of nuclear power in Australia. Since the Rudd Government, some Labor party politicians have expressed their support for expanded nuclear industries in Australia. These include Martin Ferguson and Tom Koutsantonis. Koutsantonis has expressed his support for the development of uranium enrichment capacity in South Australia.

Opinion polls

A McNair Gallup poll on the construction of nuclear power stations in Australia was carried out in 1979. The same poll was conducted again 28 years later in 2007 on 1,000 randomly selected people throughout Australia. A new poll was asked in 2009 which marked the first time that more people support nuclear power than oppose it. The support for nuclear power is still in a plurality not an outright majority.  Respondents were asked the following question:

		

The 1979 poll was conducted soon after the  Three Mile Island Unit 2 (TMI-2) nuclear power plant accident located near Pennsylvania USA where a sequence of events lead to the partial meltdown of the TMI-2 reactor core.

Opposition to the construction of nuclear power stations in the 2007 poll was strongest amongst females, Greens supporters and Australians aged 18–29 and 40–49.

				
				
The McNair Gallup Poll showed a significant difference in opinion between ALP, Coalition and Green supporters, and moderate differences by gender. Men were more likely to favour the construction of nuclear power stations (55%), with twice as many males in favour of the construction of nuclear power stations in Australia than women. 41% of men were more likely to oppose the construction of nuclear power stations in Australia.  In contrast, 65% of women were more likely to oppose the construction of nuclear power stations in Australia, while 28% favour the construction of nuclear power stations.

A 2014 independent survey, commissioned by SACOME, of 1,214 South Australians revealed a distinct trend in the community towards supporting consideration of nuclear energy.

		

The proportion of neutral respondents was at around 20-25% in all categories, with qualitative feedback largely indicating conditional support given the satisfactory addressing of concerns, or a requirement for further information. Positive responses outnumbered the negative, most dramatically men and the elderly, with less dramatic support from women.

A Morgan poll in September 2019 found support for Australian nuclear power had attained a narrow majority, with 51% in favour when reduction of carbon emissions was cited.  This was an increase of 16 percentage points from July 2011.

See also 

 Open-pool Australian lightwater reactor
 Uranium mining in Australia
 Anti-nuclear movement in Australia
 Contesting the Future of Nuclear Power
 Greenhouse Solutions with Sustainable Energy
 List of books about nuclear issues
 Non-Nuclear Futures
 Nuclear or Not?
 Nuclear Fuel Cycle Royal Commission
 Ranger Uranium Environmental Inquiry
 Reaction Time: Climate Change and the Nuclear Option
 Renewable energy commercialization
 Western Australian radioactive capsule incident

References